The Red Bridge in Tasmania crosses the Elizabeth River at Campbell Town. Built in 1838 using penal labour, it is the oldest surviving brick arch bridge in Australia, as well as the oldest bridge anywhere on the National Highway. The bridge contains three arch spans of 7.6 m (25 ft) each and holds two lanes of traffic as well as pedestrian walkways. It lies on the Midland Highway, roughly halfway between Hobart and Launceston, carrying over two million vehicles per year.

It is said to have been designed by James Blackburn, architect to Melbourne and a convict himself. It was constructed of 1,250,000 handmade bricks on dry land, and after its completion the river was diverted to flow under the bridge.

The Red Bridge is registered on the Register of the National Estate since 1978.

The bridge received an Engineering Heritage National Marker from Engineers Australia as part of its Engineering Heritage Recognition Program.

References

External links

 Bridge on the Australian Heritage Database

Road bridges in Tasmania
1838 establishments in Australia
Bridges completed in 1838
Midlands (Tasmania)
Tasmanian places listed on the defunct Register of the National Estate
Tasmanian Heritage Register
Stone arch bridges in Australia
Brick bridges
Recipients of Engineers Australia engineering heritage markers